Grotte di Castellana is a railway station serving Castellana Caves, Italy. The station is located on the Bari–Martina Franca–Taranto railway. The train services and the railway infrastructure are operated by Ferrovie del Sud Est.

Train services
The station is served by the following service(s):

Local services (Treno regionale) Bari - Conversano - Putignano - Martina Franca

References

Railway stations in Apulia
Buildings and structures in the Province of Bari